Juan Zárate is an Argentine former footballer. In Chilean football, he scored 104 goals in 156 games.

Honours

Club
Audax Italiano
 Campeonato Nacional (Chile): 1948

Individual
 Campeonato Nacional (Chile) Top-Scorer (2): 1945, 1948

References

External links
 

Argentine expatriate sportspeople in Chile
Argentine footballers
Chilean Primera División players
Audax Italiano footballers
Expatriate footballers in Chile
Club de Deportes Green Cross footballers
Association football forwards
Year of birth missing
Cobresal managers